Fort Rosalie was built by the French in 1716 within the territory of the Natchez Native Americans and it was part of the French colonial empire in the present-day city of Natchez, Mississippi.

Early history

As part of the peace terms that ended the First Natchez War in 1716, Jean-Baptiste Le Moyne, Sieur de Bienville required the Natchez to build a fort by providing materials and labor. Sited close to the main Natchez settlement of Grand Village, Fort Rosalie served as the primary French stronghold and trading post among the Natchez.

French settlements and tobacco plantations were established in Natchez territory, with the fort serving as the local seat of colonial government. Growing tension between the French and the Natchez erupted into violence several times during the 1720s, culminating in a massive Natchez attack on November 29, 1729. They destroyed the entire French settlement, killing nearly all the men and taking hundreds of women and children captive. The Natchez seized and occupied Fort Rosalie.

Retaliation by the French and allied Choctaw forces in early 1730 forced the Natchez to evacuate, leaving the fort in ruins. Through 1731, the French, with their more numerous Indian allies, continued to war with the Natchez until 1731, killing, capturing or dispersing most of the Natchez until they ceased to exist as a tribe. The French sold many of the surviving Natchez into slavery, many destined for French plantations in the Caribbean. Some escaped and found refuge among the Chickasaw, Creek, and Cherokee of the region. The French rebuilt Fort Rosalie in the early 1730s.

Fort Panmure
Following the Treaty of Paris in 1763 after the British won the Seven Years' War, the French ceded the fort and part of present-day Louisiana to British control (with New Orleans and the land west of the Mississippi River going to Spain). The British renamed the fort Fort Panmure. The British fort was named after William Maule who was the Earl of Panmure.

Capture of Fort Panmure

The British controlled the fort for 16 years—from that cession (1763) until the Spanish campaign under Galvez in 1779. After Bernardo de Galvez conquered Baton Rouge (1779), Fort Panmure capitulated without further Spanish action. Spanish military intervention was only required in 1781 to put down a rebellion by local settlers loyal to Britain. Galvez was the Governor of Spanish Luisiana and Commander of the troops of the Catholic Majesty. During the American Revolutionary War, Spain declared war against Great Britain and held control of the fort from 1779 to 1798. After 1798, the United States took over, establishing the Mississippi Territory with Natchez as its first territorial capital.

Today
The U.S. abandoned the fort in 1804. The city of Natchez traces its origin to the founding of Fort Rosalie in 1716. Today the site of the fort is part of Natchez National Historical Park.

References

Sources

 
 
 
 
 
 
 

Pre-statehood history of Mississippi
Rosalie
Natchez National Historical Park
National Register of Historic Places in Adams County, Mississippi
Louisiana (New France)
Rosalie
French-American culture in Mississippi
1716 establishments in New France
1710s in New France
1720s in New France
Historic district contributing properties in Mississippi
1779 in the United States
Conflicts in 1779
Rosalie